Hasebe (written: 長谷部) is a Japanese surname. Notable people with the surname include:

Kōhei Hasebe (born 1985), Japanese baseball player
Kōhei Hasebe, professional shogi player
Makoto Hasebe (born 1984), Japanese soccer player
Yasuharu Hasebe (1932-2009), Japanese movie director

See also
7240 Hasebe, main-belt minor planet, named after amateur astronomer Takao Hasebe

Japanese-language surnames